Sobieszewo Island (formerly ) is an island on the Baltic Sea, between the Gdańsk Bay and the delta of Vistula river. The island is part of the territory of the city of Gdańsk, Poland.

Location
The northern border of the island is the waters of Gdańsk Bay, while its southern border is a branch of the Vistula river, called Martwa Wisła. The western border was created in 1840 during the flooding and creation of a new mouth of Vistula called Śmiała Wisła. The eastern border was dug in 1895 as a new, artificially created mouth of Vistula, called Przekop Wisły.

In Górki Wschodnie is located Birds reservation and the center of the researches on birds.

Sobieszewo Island is one of the 34 quarters of Gdańsk.

Scouting and Guiding
The island is the venue for the Polish Scouting and Guiding Association's (ZHP) bid to host the 26th World Scout Jamboree in 2027. It is the venue of the European Jamboree 2020.

Gallery

See also 
 Quarters of Gdańsk

External links
 Map of Sobieszewo Island
 Stowarzyszenie Przyjaciół Wyspy Sobieszewskiej

References

Gdańsk
Islands of Poland
Landforms of Pomeranian Voivodeship